Juanita Solis may refer to:
Juanita Solis (daughter), the daughter of Carlos and Gabrielle Solis on the TV Series Desperate Housewives
Juanita "Mama" Solis, the mother of Carlos Solis on the TV series Desperate Housewives